Albera may refer to:
 Albera, a genus of leafhoppers (family Cicadellidae)
 Albera Massif, a mountain range in the north of Catalonia, between France and Spain
Albera (cattle), indigenous to the massif
 Albera Ligure, a comune in Piedmont, Italy
 Aldo Albera (born 1923), an Italian sprint canoer